Addelman is a surname of German origin, and means "nobleman", being a combination of "adel" (nobility) and "mann" (man). Notable people with the surname include:

Ben Addelman (born 1977), Canadian filmmaker
Rebecca Addelman (born 1981), Canadian comedian, writer, director, and actress

See also
Adelman